There are currently 162 active-duty three-star officers in the uniformed services of the United States: 49 in the Army, 18 in the Marine Corps, 37 in the Navy, 46 in the Air Force, six in the Space Force, four in the Coast Guard, one in the Public Health Service Commissioned Corps, and one in the United States Maritime Service.

List of designated three-star positions

Department of Defense

Office of the Secretary of Defense

Joint Staff

Unified Combatant Commands

Other joint positions

Department of the Army

United States Army

Department of the Navy

United States Marine Corps

United States Navy

Department of the Air Force

United States Air Force

United States Space Force

Department of Homeland Security

United States Coast Guard

Department of Health and Human Services

United States Public Health Service Commissioned Corps

Department of Transportation

United States Maritime Service

List of pending appointments

Statutory limits

As with four-star officers, the U.S. Code explicitly limits the number of three-star officers that may be on active duty at any given time. The total number of active-duty general or flag officers is capped at 218 for the Army, 149 for the Navy, 170 for the Air Force, 62 for the Marine Corps, and 21 for the Space Force. For the Army, Marine Corps, Navy, Air Force, and Space Force, no more than about 23% of each service's active-duty general or flag officers may have more than two stars, and statute sets the total number of three-star officers allowed in each service. This is set at 38 three-star Army generals, 15 three-star Marine Corps generals, 28 three-star Navy admirals, 35 three-star Air Force generals, five three-star Space Force generals, and five three-star Coast Guard admirals.

While a number of these positions are set by statute, most do not have the accompanying statutory three-star grade. By convention, however:
 For the Army, lieutenant generals constitute corps and field army commanders, deputy and assistant chiefs of staff of the Army staff, deputies of Army four-star commands, commanders of high-level geographic or component commands, the chief of Army reserve, as well as high-level specialty positions including the inspector general, surgeon general, and judge advocate general. 
 For the Navy, vice admirals constitute commanders of numbered fleets, deputy chiefs of naval operations, deputies of Navy four-star commands, commanders of high-level geographic and component commands, and specialty positions such as the type commanders of naval air forces, naval submarine forces and naval surface forces, as well as the naval inspector general and judge advocate general.
 For the Air Force, lieutenant generals constitute commanders of large numbered air forces or major commands, deputy and assistant chiefs of staff of the Air staff, deputies of four-star major commands, the chief of Air Force Reserve, as well as the specialty positions of the inspector general, surgeon general and judge advocate general.
 For the Marine Corps, lieutenant generals constitute commanders of high-level geographic and functional Marine commands including the marine expeditionary forces, deputy commandants attached to Headquarters Marine Corps and commander of the Marine Forces Reserve.

 For the Space Force, lieutenant generals constitute the deputy chiefs of staff of the Space Staff and commanders of high-level field commands.
 For the Coast Guard, vice admirals constitute the deputy commandants for operations and mission support, as well as the operational area commanders of the Atlantic and Pacific region. By statute, there may not be more than five three-star positions in the Coast Guard and, if there are five, one must be the chief of staff of the Coast Guard.
 For the Public Health Service Commissioned Corps, the surgeon general of the United States is a three-star vice admiral by statute, equivalent in grade to the surgeon general of the Army.
 Although the rank of vice admiral exists in the National Oceanic and Atmospheric Administration Commissioned Officer Corps (NOAA Corps), its use is rare. Only two officers of the NOAA Corps or its ancestor organizations have reached the rank of vice admiral.

The President may also designate positions of importance and responsibility to other agencies in the executive branch aside from the Coast Guard and National Oceanic and Atmospheric Administration to be held by an officer with the grade of vice admiral, with corresponding pay and allowance.

Exceptions

Exceptions exist that allow for the promotion of three-star officers beyond statutory limits. The secretary of defense can designate up to 49 three-star officers, who do not count against any service's general- or flag-officer limit, to serve in one of several joint positions. For three-star officers, these include senior positions on the Joint Staff such as the director of the Joint Staff, vice chief of the National Guard Bureau, and deputy commanders of unified combatant commands. Officers serving in certain intelligence positions are not counted against statutory limits, including the deputy director of the Central Intelligence Agency, associate director for military affairs of the Central Intelligence Agency, and the advisor for military affairs to the director of National Intelligence. The President may also add up to 15 three-star slots to one service if they are offset by removing an equivalent number from other services. Finally, all statutory limits may be waived at the President's discretion during time of war or national emergency.

Appointment

Like four-star ranks, three-star ranks are temporary, being tied to positions where the officeholder is authorized to assume said rank. Their rank expires with the expiration of their term of office, which is normally set by statute. The president nominates three-star officers from any eligible officers holding one-star grade and above who also meet the other requirements for the position, based on the advice of their respective executive department secretary, service secretary, and if applicable the joint chiefs. The nominee must be confirmed via majority by the Senate before the appointee can take office and thus assume the rank. Senate committees may hold hearings to consider any nominee for appointment to three-star grade, but usually only convene for nominations of selected four-star positions.

While it is rare for three-star or four-star nominations to face even token opposition in the Senate, nominations that do face opposition due to controversy surrounding the nominee in question are typically withdrawn. 

 For example, the nomination of Major General Ryan F. Gonsalves to be commanding general of U.S. Army Europe in 2017 was withdrawn after an investigation was launched into the general's inappropriate comment to a female Congressional staffer. 

 Rear Admiral Elizabeth L. Train was once the leading candidate to be director of naval intelligence and deputy chief of naval operations for information warfare in 2015, but her nomination was withdrawn the following year due to dysfunction within the naval intelligence community leadership, and her superior's suspected role in the Fat Leonard scandal. 

 The President withdrew the nomination of Lieutenant General Susan J. Helms to become vice commander of Air Force Space Command in 2013 after eight months of inaction in the Senate, owing to concerns about her overturning the ruling in a sexual assault case under her command.

 Lieutenant General Mary A. Legere was widely considered a leading candidate to succeed Lieutenant General Michael T. Flynn as director of the Defense Intelligence Agency in 2014, but her name was removed from consideration following House backlash over her involvement in several controversial Army intelligence projects.

 Major General Raphael J. Hallada was withdrawn from consideration to become commanding general of Fifth Army in 1991, relating to his decision to not prosecute two soldiers responsible for an artillery accident at his command of Fort Sill.

 Major General Joseph J. Taluto withdrew himself from consideration to become director of the Army National Guard in 2010, due to public controversy and subsequent Senate inaction over his handling of the deaths of Phillip Esposito and Louis Allen.

 And Rear Admiral Elizabeth A. Hight's nomination to be director of the Defense Information Systems Agency in 2008 was withdrawn due to concerns about a possible conflict of interest with her husband, a retired Air Force general who was employed by a prominent Defense contractor.

Nominations that are not withdrawn are allowed to expire without action at the end of the legislative session, with said nominations being returned to the President.

 For example, the Senate declined to schedule a vote for Major General Charles M. Gurganus to be elevated to three-star rank in 2013 and assigned as director of the Marine Corps staff due to concerns of negligence leading to the September 2012 Camp Bastion raid.

 The nomination of Rear Admiral Thomas P. Ostebo for promotion to vice admiral and assignment as deputy commandant for mission support of the Coast Guard in 2014 was returned to the President, due to a hold from a senator who opposed the closure of two Coast Guard facilities in response to sequestration cuts.

Additionally, events that take place after Senate confirmation may still delay or even prevent the nominee from assuming office, necessitating that another nominee be selected and considered by the Senate. Even after the nominee assumes command, various events can occur that alter their circumstances in holding the office.

 For example, Major General John G. Rossi, who had been confirmed for appointment as the commanding general of the U.S. Army Space and Missile Defense Command in April 2016 committed suicide two days before his scheduled promotion. As a result, the incumbent commander, Lieutenant General David L. Mann, remained in command beyond statutory term limits until another nominee, Major General James H. Dickinson was confirmed by the Senate.

 Vice Admiral Scott A. Stearney assumed command of U.S. Naval Forces Central Command, Fifth Fleet, and Combined Maritime Forces in May 2018. His death in December 2018 resulted in the speedy confirmation of Rear Admiral James J. Malloy in the same month for appointment to three-star rank as his replacement.

Command elevation and reduction

Any billet in the armed forces may be designated as a position of importance requiring the holder of the position to be of three-star or four-star rank. One-star and two-star billets may be elevated to three-star or four-star level as appropriate, either by act of Congress, or within statutory limits by the services at their discretion. Congress may propose such elevations or reductions to the President and Department of Defense. Due to the higher number of three-star appointments available by statute compared to four-star appointments, shuffling of such billets within services and between services occurs at a relatively steady pace, with significant changes on average every two to three years, compared to those at four-star grade which shuffle on average every four to five years.

The existing commander of a lower-level command or office elevated to three-star rank can be appointed to grade in their present position, reassigned to another office of equal grade, or face retirement if another nominee is selected as their relief.

 For example, Major General Scott C. Black became judge advocate general of the Army in October 2005. With the elevation of the office to three-star rank in 2008, Black was nominated for promotion to lieutenant general, and assumed said rank in December 2008.
 Vice Admiral Henry H. Mauz Jr., commander of U.S. Seventh Fleet, was dual-hatted as commander of U.S. Naval Forces Central Command in August 1990. The incumbent commander, Captain Robert Sutton did not receive appointment to three-star grade and was thus reassigned as commander of the U.S. Naval Logistics Support Force under Mauz's command.

A two-star billet may be elevated to three-star level, in accordance with being designated as a position of importance, to highlight importance to the defense apparatus as a whole or achieve parity with equivalent commands in the same area of responsibility or service branch.

 The National Defense Authorization Act of 2001 elevated all service reserve and National Guard components to three-star level. Consequently, all affected components (the Army Reserve and Army National Guard, Navy Reserve, Air Force Reserve and Air National Guard, and Marine Forces Reserve) had their existing commanders promoted to three-star rank, or promoted the first commander assigned after passage of the Act to three-star rank.
 The National Defense Authorization Act of 2012 elevated the office of vice chief of the National Guard Bureau to three-star level, achieving parity with the three-star directors of the Army National Guard and Air National Guard. Major General Joseph L. Lengyel was subsequently appointed to the grade of lieutenant general and assumed office on 18 August 2012.
 Headquarters Marine Corps Bulletin 5400 directed the elevation of U.S. Marine Corps Training and Education Command to three-star level and transitioning it to a direct reporting unit responsible to the commandant of the Marine Corps. The incumbent commanding general, Major General William F. Mullen III, subsequently relinquished command to Lieutenant General Lewis A. Craparotta on 3 August 2020.

A four-star billet may also be reduced to three-star level, usually to compensate for another billet being elevated to four-star level and thus remain within statutory limits. Congressional approval must be obtained if it is determined that a new three-star appointment beyond statutory limits is necessary.

 For example, Air Education and Training Command, a four-star major command since 1975, was downgraded to three-star level to compensate for the elevation of Air Force Global Strike Command to four-star level, as congressional approval was required to bypass the authorized limit of nine four-star commands. Lieutenant General Darryl Roberson relieved General Robin Rand as AETC commander on 21 July 2015.
 U.S. Army Europe was a three-star command four separate times: from establishment to 1944; the tours of Lieutenant Generals Clarence R. Huebner in 1949 and Manton S. Eddy from 1952 to 1953; and after the deactivation of Seventh Army from 2011 to 2020. The final three-star general to command USAREUR was Lieutenant General Christopher G. Cavoli, who was promoted to general in 2020, with the consolidation of USAREUR and U.S. Army Africa into U.S. Army Europe and Africa.

Tour length

The standard tour length for a three-star officer is three years, specifically a two-year term with a one-year extension. Unlike with grade, many three-star positions do have stipulated term lengths in the U.S. Code, which may not necessarily equate to the standard term length:
 Deputy commanders of unified combatant commands, as a joint duty assignment, serve for one to two years.
 Inspectors general of the Army, Navy, and Air Force serve for a nominal four-year term.
 Judge advocates general of the Army, Navy, and Air Force serve for a nominal four-year term.
 Three-star chiefs of service reserve components serve for a nominal four-year term in office, but may serve for up to eight years if reappointed to serve for a second term. Typically, a reserve component chief serves for two to three years.
 Three-star chiefs of Army branches, (except the judge advocate general) serve for a nominal four-year term.
 Superintendents of the U.S. Military Academy, the U.S. Naval Academy, and the U.S. Air Force Academy serve for a nominal three-year term, though it is common for them to serve for four to five years.
 The surgeon general of the United States serves for a nominal four-year term.

All appointees serve at the pleasure of the president. Extensions of the standard tour length can be approved, within statutory limits, by their respective service secretaries, the secretary of defense, the president, and/or Congress but these are rare, as they block other officers from being promoted. Some statutory limits of tour length under the U.S. Code can be waived in times of national emergency or war. Three-star ranks may also be given by act of Congress but this is extremely rare.
 Rear Admiral John D. Bulkeley was promoted to vice admiral on the retired list in the Senate by unanimous voice vote in 1988, in recognition of his years of service to the country, including the rescue of General Douglas MacArthur from Corregidor that earned him the Medal of Honor.

Retirement

Besides voluntary retirement, statute sets a number of mandates for retirement. A three-star officer may serve for a maximum of 38 years of commissioned service unless reappointed to grade to serve longer or appointed to a higher grade. Three-star officers on reserve active duty must retire after five years in grade or 30 days after completion of 38 years of commissioned service, whichever is later, unless reappointed to grade to serve longer. Three-star reserve officers of the Army and Air Force can have their retirements deferred by their service secretary until the officer's 66th birthday, which the secretary of defense may do for all active-duty officers, and the president can defer it until the officer's 68th birthday. Otherwise all general and flag officers must retire the month after their 64th birthday. Officers that served several years in the enlisted ranks prior to receiving their commission typically don't make it to the 38 years in commission mark, because they are still subject to the age restrictions for retirement. As holders of the second-highest grade, three-star officers rarely receive deferment to serve beyond their 64th birthday, a more common case for officers who are promoted to four-star rank.

By statute, any three-star officer assigned as superintendent of the United States Military Academy, superintendent of the United States Naval Academy, and superintendent of the United States Air Force Academy must retire upon completion of their assignment, unless a waiver is granted by the secretary of defense. The secretary of defense must also notify the House and Senate Armed Services committees and include a written notification of intent from the president to nominate the officer for reassignment. If a waiver is granted, the subsequent nomination and appointment of such officer having served as superintendent of the Academy to a further assignment in lieu of retirement shall be subject to the advice and consent of the Senate.

 Lieutenant General Sidney Bryan Berry is the last superintendent of the U.S. Military Academy not subject to the mandates for retirement, serving as commanding general of V Corps from 1977 to 1980 after his tenure as superintendent from 1974 to 1976. His successor, General Andrew J. Goodpaster is the latest retired officer recalled to serve as superintendent, serving from 1977 to 1981.

 Rear Admiral Thomas C. Lynch is the last superintendent of the U.S. Naval Academy not subject to the mandates for retirement, serving as director of the Navy staff from 1994 to 1995 after his tenure as superintendent from 1991 to 1994. His successor, Admiral Charles R. Larson is the last four-star admiral to serve as superintendent, from 1994 to 1998.

 Major General Robert E. Kelley is the last superintendent of the U.S. Air Force Academy not subject to the mandates for retirement, serving as the vice commander of Tactical Air Command from 1983 to 1986 after his tenure as superintendent from 1981 to 1983.

Senior officers typically retire well in advance of the statutory age and service limits, so as not to impede the upward career mobility of their juniors. The higher number of available three-star slots overall (ranging from around 100 to 200) means that lateral promotion is more likely for officers at grade before they either retire or are appointed to a higher grade. An officer who vacates a position bearing that rank has no more than 60 days to be appointed or reappointed to a position of equal or greater importance, including positions of four-star grade, before involuntary retirement.
 For example, Lieutenant General H. Steven Blum was appointed as deputy commander of U.S. Northern Command in 2009. The incumbent deputy commander, Lieutenant General William G. Webster Jr., was appointed as commanding general of U.S. Army Central, whose incumbent commanding general, Lieutenant General James J. Lovelace Jr., received no further appointment and retired at the age of 60, with 39 years of service and six years in grade.
 Rear Admiral Ronald A. Route was promoted to vice admiral and appointed as naval inspector general in 2004. The incumbent inspector general, Vice Admiral Albert T. Church, was appointed as director of the Navy staff, whose incumbent director, Vice Admiral Patricia A. Tracey, received no further appointment and retired at the age of 52, with 34 years of service and six years in grade.
 Major General William H. Etter was promoted to lieutenant general and appointed as commander of First Air Force in 2013. The incumbent commander, Lieutenant General Stanley E. Clarke III, was appointed as director of the Air National Guard, whose incumbent director, Lieutenant General Harry M. Wyatt III, received no further appointment and retired at the age of 63, with 42 years of service and four years in grade.
 Rear Admiral Steven D. Poulin was promoted to vice admiral and appointed as commander of the Coast Guard Atlantic Area in 2020. The incumbent commander, Vice Admiral Scott A. Buschman, was appointed as deputy commandant for operations; the incumbent deputy commandant, Vice Admiral Daniel B. Abel, received no further appointment and retired at the age of 59, with 37 years of service and two years in grade.

A three-star officer may also be reduced to their permanent rank pending circumstances that delay appointment to another three-star position of importance. Historically, officers leaving three-star or four-star positions were allowed to revert to their permanent two-star ranks to mark time in lesser jobs until statutory retirement, but now such officers are expected to retire immediately to avoid obstructing the promotion flow.

 For example, Lieutenant General Timothy J. Kadavy reverted to his permanent rank of major general while awaiting confirmation as vice chief of the National Guard Bureau in 2019, as he had not been assigned to another three-star position within 60 days of his relief as director of the Army National Guard. After his nomination was returned to the president without action, he was certified to retire as a lieutenant general in 2020.

 Vice Admiral John Poindexter reverted to his permanent rank of rear admiral in 1986, as he was not appointed by the Senate to another three-star post within 90 days after resigning as national security advisor to the President due to controversy surrounding the Iran-Contra scandal, and was reassigned to the Navy staff until retirement in 1987. His request to retire as a vice admiral was deferred by the secretary of the Navy due to expected congressional opposition.

To retire at three-star grade, an officer must accumulate at least three years of satisfactory active-duty service in that grade, as determined by the secretary of defense. The president and Congress must also receive certification by either the under secretary of defense for personnel and readiness, the deputy under secretary of defense for personnel and readiness, or the secretary of defense that the retiree served satisfactorily in grade. The secretary of defense may reduce this requirement to two years, but only if the officer is not being investigated for misconduct. The president may also reduce these requirements even further, or waive the requirements altogether, if he so chooses. Three-star officers who do not meet the service-in-grade requirement will retire at the last permanent rank satisfactorily held for six months. The retiree may also be subject to congressional approval by the Senate before the retiree can retire in grade. It is extraordinarily rare for a three-star or four-star officer not to be certified to retire in grade or for the Senate to seek final approval.

 For example, Lieutenant General Brent Scowcroft was certified by the Senate in 1975 to retire as a lieutenant general despite holding said rank for only a year as national security advisor to the President. Scowcroft could have been reappointed to grade to serve as national security advisor while on active duty, but instead held the office as a civilian.

 Lieutenant General Craig A. Franklin retired on 1 April 2014, with two years and two days in grade, in response to charges of partiality in overseeing cases of sexual assault in Third Air Force. Despite not being penalized for misconduct, his retirement before accumulating statutory time in grade resulted in his reduction to major general on the retired list.

 Lieutenant General Ronald F. Lewis was relieved as senior military assistant to the secretary of defense on 12 November 2015, with approximately four months in grade. He subsequently reverted to his permanent rank of major general pending an investigation by the Department of Defense inspector general for misconduct. His certification of satisfactory service as a major general was revoked, thus reducing his retirement rank to brigadier general.

Officers who are under investigation for misconduct typically are not allowed to retire until the investigation completes, so that the secretary of defense can decide whether to certify that their performance was satisfactory enough to retire in their highest grade.

 For example, Lieutenant General Lee K. Levy II relinquished his three-star command in 2018, but remained on active duty for over a year after his retirement ceremony in his permanent rank of major general pending an investigation by the Air Force inspector general, before being allowed to retire as a major general.

 Vice Admiral Michael H. Miller relinquished his three-star command as scheduled in 2014, but remained on active duty for almost a year in his permanent grade of rear admiral while under investigation for the Fat Leonard corruption scandal. He was permitted to retire at three-star grade after being censured by the secretary of the Navy.

Furthermore, all retired officers may still be subjected to the Uniform Code of Military Justice and disciplinary action, including reduction in retirement rank, by the secretary of defense or the president if they are deemed to have served unsatisfactorily in rank, post their retirement.

 Lieutenant General Philip R. Kensinger Jr., who retired from the Army as a lieutenant general, faced court martial and demotion nearly two years after his retirement date of 1 February 2006, for making false statements regarding the Pat Tillman friendly fire incident. He was allowed to retain his three-star rank after the secretary of the Army opted not to pursue the heavier punishment, instead issuing Kensinger an official reprimand and censure.

Officers holding a temporary three-star or four-star rank typically step down from their posts up to 60 days in advance of their official retirement dates. Officers retire on the first day of the month, so once a retirement month has been selected, the relief and retirement ceremonies are scheduled by counting backwards from that date by the number of days of accumulated leave remaining to the retiring officer. During this period, termed transition leave or terminal leave, the officer is considered to be awaiting retirement but still on active duty.

 For example, Lieutenant General Donald C. Wurster was relieved as commander of Air Force Special Operations Command on 24 June 2011, and held his retirement ceremony the same day, but remained on active duty until his official retirement date on 1 August 2011.

A statutory limit can be waived by the president with the consent of Congress if it serves national interest. However, this is extremely rare. Only two four-star officers have been granted such a waiver in American history: General Lewis B. Hershey, who served as director of the Selective Service System from 1941 to 1970, and Admiral Hyman G. Rickover, who served as director of Naval Reactors from 1949 to 1982.

See also 
 Lieutenant general (United States)
 Vice admiral (United States)
 List of active duty United States four-star officers
 List of active duty United States Army major generals
 List of active duty United States Marine Corps major generals
 List of active duty United States rear admirals
 List of active duty United States Air Force major generals
 List of active duty United States Space Force general officers
 List of current United States National Guard major generals
 List of active duty United States senior enlisted leaders and advisors
 List of United States Army lieutenant generals since 2020
 List of United States Marine Corps lieutenant generals since 2010
 List of United States Navy vice admirals on active duty before 1960
 List of United States Navy vice admirals since 2020
 List of United States Air Force lieutenant generals since 2020
 List of United States Space Force lieutenant generals
 List of United States Coast Guard vice admirals
 List of United States Public Health Service Commissioned Corps vice admirals

Notes

References

+
Three-star
Three-star officers
United S
United States three-star officers